Miyamura is a Japanese surname. Notable people with the surname include:

, Japanese badminton player
, Japanese badminton player
Hideaki Miyamura (born 1955), Japanese-born American potter
Hiroshi H. Miyamura (1925-2022), American United States Army soldier
, Japanese footballer
, Japanese voice actress, actress, singer and sound director

See also
Miyamura Station, a railway station in Miyazu, Kyoto Prefecture, Japan
Miyamura High School, a high school in Gallup, New Mexico, United States

Japanese-language surnames